Afghan Canadians are Canadians with ancestry from Afghanistan. They form the second largest Afghan community in North America after Afghan Americans. Their ethnic origin may come from any of the ethnic groups of Afghanistan, which include Pashtun, Tajik, Uzbek, Hazara, Turkmen, etc. In the Canada 2016 Census about 83,995 Canadians were from Afghanistan.

They are mostly concentrated in the southwestern region of Ontario and the Greater Toronto Area, with significant communities mostly in Vancouver, Ottawa, and Montreal. In addition to the official languages of Canada, Afghan Canadians are also fluent in their native languages such as Dari, Pashto, Uzbek, Turkmen, etc.

In the Canadian Census, Canadians with descent from Afghanistan are classified as being West Central Asian.

Media
The diaspora also have media outlets for the Afghan community, including private TV channels such as Watan E Maa, AfghanJavan TV and Afghan Nobel TV.

Afghan Canadians by Canadian province or territory (2016)

Notable individuals
 Masooma (Roya) Sadat - CEO & founder at ACSA international nonprofit organization - business mentor - CEO at ROYA fashion 
 Kawa Ada — actor and playwright
 Fardaws Aimaq — basketball player
 Layla Alizada — actress
 Hangama — singer
 Donnie Keshawarz – actor
 Sadi Jalali — soccer player
 Nasser Jamal — football player
 Mozhdah Jamalzadah – singer
 Maryam Monsef – member of Parliament for Peterborough-Kawartha; first Afghan-Canadian elected to Canada's House of Commons, former Minister of Status of Women
 Ariel Nasr - documentary filmmaker
 Nelofer Pazira – filmmaker and author
 Parween Pazhwak – Persian artist and poet
 Humira Saqib – Journalist
 Massih Wassey – soccer player
 Hamid Zaher – writer and gay rights activist

See also 

 Afghan diaspora
 West Asian Canadians
 Pashtun diaspora
 Hazara diaspora
 List of Afghans

References

External links 
 Rebuilding Afghanistan

Afghan
Afghan Canadian
Asian Canadian
Canadian people of Afghan descent
West Asian Canadians